The Cathedral of St. Paul is an Episcopal cathedral in Erie, Pennsylvania, United States. It is the seat of the Diocese of Northwestern Pennsylvania.  St. Paul's Church was founded on St. Patrick's Day in 1827.  The church became the cathedral for the Diocese of Erie on February 21, 1915.  The diocese changed its name to Northwestern Pennsylvania in 1981.

See also
List of the Episcopal cathedrals of the United States
List of cathedrals in the United States

References

Religious organizations established in 1827
19th-century Episcopal church buildings
Gothic Revival church buildings in Pennsylvania
Episcopal churches in Pennsylvania
Paul, Erie
Churches in Erie, Pennsylvania
Churches in Erie County, Pennsylvania
1827 establishments in Pennsylvania